The Cedar Falls Historic District is a nationally recognized historic district located in Cedar Falls, Iowa, United States. It was listed on the National Register of Historic Places in 2017.  It is made up of 59 buildings that were constructed between 1860 and 1960.  Of those, 46 were determined to be significantly historic.  Four of the buildings were individually listed on the National Register of Historic Places in previous years; they include the Black Hawk Hotel (1870), the Odd Fellows Temple (1902), and the Oster Regent Theater (1910).

References

Cedar Falls, Iowa
Historic districts in Black Hawk County, Iowa
National Register of Historic Places in Black Hawk County, Iowa
Historic districts on the National Register of Historic Places in Iowa